Palisota preussiana is a species of plant in the Commelinaceae family. It is found in Cameroon and Equatorial Guinea. Its natural habitats are subtropical or tropical moist lowland forests and subtropical or tropical moist montane forests. It is threatened by habitat loss.

References

External links
 

preussiana
Vulnerable plants
Plants described in 1901
Flora of Africa
Taxonomy articles created by Polbot